James O'Shaughnessy may refer to:
 James O'Shaughnessy (investor), American investor, the founder of O'Shaughnessy Asset Management, and the founder of O'Shaughnessy Ventures
 James O'Shaughnessy (American football), American football tight end
 James O'Shaughnessy, Baron O'Shaughnessy, British politician